Web of Danger is a 1947 American action film directed by Philip Ford, written by David Lang and Milton Raison, and starring Adele Mara, Bill Kennedy, Damian O'Flynn, Richard Loo, Victor Sen Yung and Roy Barcroft. It was released on June 10, 1947, by Republic Pictures.

Plot

Cast   
Adele Mara as Peg Mallory
Bill Kennedy as Ernie Reardon
Damian O'Flynn as Bill O'Hara
Richard Loo as Wing
Victor Sen Yung as Sam
Roy Barcroft as Monks
William Hall as Slim
J. Farrell MacDonald as Scotty MacKronish 
Archie Twitchell as Ramsey
Edward Gargan as Dolan
Chester Clute as Cornflakes Eater
Ralph Sanford as Peterson
Russell Hicks as Mr. Gallagher

References

External links 
 

1947 films
American action films
1940s action films
Republic Pictures films
Films directed by Philip Ford
American black-and-white films
1940s English-language films
1940s American films